Eitan Muller (Israel) is an Israeli professor of marketing at Stern School of Business at New York University and Arison School of Business at Reichman University. Muller's research focuses on diffusion of innovation, new products and tech, and monetization and pricing.

Career
Muller received his BSc in mathematics with distinction from the Technion - Israel Institute of Technology, then his MBA in marketing with distinction from Kellogg Graduate School of Management, Northwestern University. He completed his PhD in managerial economics from Kellogg Graduate School of Management at Northwestern University through its department of managerial economics and decision sciences. Muller received his first academic position as an assistant professor at the University of Pennsylvania Economics Department. Since then, he has held positions at the Hebrew University of Jerusalem, Tel Aviv University, and New York University. He has held visiting positions at University of Pennsylvania, Southern Methodist University, Northwestern University, University of British Columbia, University of Texas, and the University of Cyprus. In 2011 he moved to Arison School of Business at the Reichman University,

Muller has held roles including subject-matter expert at PricewaterhouseCoopers and IBM Business Consulting (1994–2005); board member and chair of the audit committee, Israel Discount Bank (1992–2002); board of directors, Oxygen and Argon Works (1986–2015); board of directors and member of the audit committee, Trendline Ltd. (1997–2002); board of governors, Tel Aviv University (1992–1994); and associate dean, faculty of management, Tel Aviv University (1994–1995).

Research

Muller's research focuses on new product growth, innovation, and new product pricing. he has published three books on new product growth and innovation.

Muller has served as vice president of publication, European Marketing Academy (2017–2020), editor-in-chief, International Journal of Research in Marketing (2012–2015), and associate editor, Management Science (1990–2001). Muller has held editorial review board positions for the following publications: Technological Forecasting and Social Change (2003–2008), Marketing Science (1986–2002), Journal of Marketing (2003–2018), Journal of Marketing Research (1994–2020), and International Journal of Research in Marketing (2019–current).

Published works
Muller has more than 100 publications that have been cited over 24,000 times, with an h-index of 55.

Books
Vijay Mahajan, Eitan Muller, and Jerry Wind, New Product Diffusion Models, Boston: Kluwer Academic Publishers, 2000
 Eitan Muller, Renana Peres, and Vijay Mahajan, Innovation Diffusion and New Product Growth, Boston: MSI Publications, 2009
 Elie Ofek, Eitan Muller, and Barak Libai, Innovation Equity: Assessing and Managing the Monetary Value of New Products and Services, Chicago: University of Chicago Press, 2016. Translated into Chinese and published in 2018 by CITIC press, Beijing

Harvard Business School Cases:
 Elie Ofek, Barak Libai, Eitan Muller, Customer Lifetime Social Value (CLSV), 2021
 Elie Ofek, Barak Libai, Eitan Muller, Customer Management Dynamics and Cohort Analysis, 2020
 Elie Ofek, Barak Libai, Eitan Muller, Ride-Hailing Services: Forecasting Uber's Growth, 2019

Selected articles
 Eyal Biyalogorsky, Amir Heiman, Eitan Muller, The differential effects of time and usage on the brand premiums of automobiles, International Journal of Research in Marketing, 2001
 Gil Appel, Barak Libai, Eitan Muller, and Ron Shachar, On the Monetization of Mobile Apps, International Journal of Research in Marketing, (37), 2020, pp. 93–107
 Eitan Muller, and Renana Peres, The Effect of Social Network Structure on Innovation Performance: A Review and Directions for Research, International Journal of Research in Marketing, (36), 2019, pp. 3–19
 Jacob Goldenberg, Barak Libai, and Eitan Muller, The Chilling Effects of Network Externalities, International Journal of Research in Marketing, (27), 2010, pp. 4–15
 Jacob Goldenberg, Barak Libai, Sarit Moldovan, and Eitan Muller, The NPV of Bad News, International Journal of Research in Marketing, 24, 2007, pp. 186–200
 Shlomo Kalish, Vijay Mahajan, and Eitan Muller, Waterfall and Sprinkler New-Product Strategies in Competitive Global Markets, International Journal of Research in Marketing, (12), 1995 pp. 105–119

Awards and recognitions
Muller has been a recipient of several industry and academic awards for his research, publications, and academic contributions which include among the rest the European Marketing Academy International Journal of Research in Marketing, Best Paper Award (2020), Provost Award for Faculty Research Excellence, Reichman University (2020), Distinguished Marketing Scholar Award of the European Marketing Academy (EMAC) (2019), Emerald Citation of Excellence Award (2016), European Marketing Academy International Journal of Research in Marketing Best Paper Award – finalist (2007 & 2010), European Marketing Academy International Journal of Research in Marketing Best Paper Award (1995).

External links 
 Eitan Muller Website
 Prof. Eitan Muller in Reichman University Website
 Prof. Eitan Muller in New York University Website
 Prof. Eitan Muller in Tel Aviv University Website

References 

Living people
Israeli marketing people
Year of birth missing (living people)
Academic staff of Reichman University
New York University faculty